The Mosque River is a tributary of the Skeena River in the Stikine Region of the province of British Columbia, Canada.

The river's entire watershed is within the traditional territory of the Gitxsan First Nation and is part of the lands currently under negotiation for aboriginal title according to the British Columbia Treaty Process.

The Mosque River was named in 1940, in association with Mosque Mountain.

Geography
The Mosque River originates on the east side of Diagonal Mountain. The continental divide runs along the east and north sides of the Mosque River's watershed.

The Mosque River generally flows southwest, collecting a number of unnamed tributaries before emptying into the Skeena River. Its watershed is located partly in the Skeena Mountains and partly in the Omineca Mountains.

Significant mountains in and around the river's watershed include Fort Mountain, Diagonal Mountain, South Pass Peak, Bird Hill, and Mosque Mountain. Subranges of the Skeena and Omineca Mountains in the Mosque River's watershed include the Tatlatui Range, Hogem Ranges, and Slamgeesh Range.

History
The Mosque River is in the territory of the Gitxsan First Nation. Gitxsan salmon fishing sites are located at numerous places along the Skeena River, including at the confluence of the Skeena and Mosque Rivers.

The Mosque River was named in 1940, in association with Mosque Mountain, which is located on the southern edge of the river's watershed. At least two other streams are named in association with Mosque Mountain: Islam Creek and Minaret Creek, both of which flow south from Mosque Mountain to the Sustut River. Mosque Mountain was named in 1940, for its dome shape which was thought to resemble a mosque.

The Mosque River watershed is part of the lands currently under negotiation for Gitxsan aboriginal title according to the British Columbia Treaty Process. As of August 2021 the treaty negotiations are in the fourth stage of the process. The Mosque River watershed falls under two of the treaty process's Strategic Engagement Agreements. The northern part of the watershed is included in the Upper Skeena Laxyip Strategic Engagement Agreement. The southern part is included in the Sustut Laxyip Strategic Engagement Agreement.

See also
List of British Columbia rivers

References

External links
 

 

 

Gitxsan
North Coast Regional District
Omineca Country
Rivers of British Columbia
Rivers of the North Coast of British Columbia
Rivers of the Omineca Mountains
Skeena Country
Stikine Country